The 2020 Reno 1868 FC season was the club's fourth season of existence and their fourth in the United Soccer League Championship (USL-C), the second tier of American soccer. This article covers the period from November 18, 2019, the day after the 2019 USL-C Playoff Final, to the conclusion of the 2020 USL-C Playoff Final, scheduled for November 12–16, 2020.

Current roster

Current staff

Competitions

Exhibitions

USL Championship

Standings — Group A

Match results
On December 20, 2019, the USL announced the 2020 season schedule, creating the following fixture list for the early part of Reno'a season.

In the preparations for the resumption of league play following the shutdown prompted by the COVID-19 pandemic, the remainder of 1868's schedule was announced on July 2.

USL Cup Playoffs

U.S. Open Cup 

As a USL Championship club, Reno will enter the competition in the Second Round, to be played April 7–9.

References

Reno 1868 FC
Reno 1868 FC
Reno 1868 FC seasons
Reno 1868 FC